Thoughtworks is a publicly owned, global technology company with 49 offices in 18 countries. It provides software design and delivery, and tools and consulting services. The company is closely associated with the movement for agile software development, and has contributed to a content of open source products. Thoughtworks' business includes Digital Product Development Services, Digital Experience and Distributed Agile software development.

History

1980s to 1990s 
In the late 1980s, Roy Singham founded Singham Business Services as a management consulting company servicing the equipment leasing industry in a Chicago basement. According to Singham, after two-to-three years, Singham started recruiting additional staff and came up with the name Thoughtworks in 1990. The company was incorporated under the new name in 1993 and focused on building software applications. Over time, Thoughtworks' technology shifted from C++ and Forte 4GL in the mid-1990s to include Java in the late 1990s.

1990s to 2010s 
Martin Fowler joined the company in 1999 and became its chief scientist in 2000.

In 2001, Thoughtworks agreed to settle a lawsuit by Microsoft for $480,000 for deploying unlicensed copies of office productivity software to employees.

Also in 2001, Fowler, Jim Highsmith, and other key software figures authored the Agile Manifesto. The company began using agile techniques while working on a leasing project. Thoughtworks' technical expertise expanded with the .NET Framework in 2002, C# in 2004, Ruby and the Rails platform in 2006. In 2002, Thoughtworks chief scientist Martin Fowler wrote "Patterns of Enterprise Application Architecture" with contributions by ThoughtWorkers David Rice and Matthew Foemmel, as well as outside contributors Edward Hieatt, Robert Mee, and Randy Stafford.

Thoughtworks Studios was launched as its product division in 2006 and shut down in 2020. The division created, supported and sold agile project management and software development and deployment tools including Mingle, Gauge(formerly Twist), Snap CI and GoCD.

On 2 March 2007, Thoughtworks announced Trevor Mather as the new CEO. Singham became Executive chairman. Also in March 2007, Rebecca Parsons assumed the role of Chief Technical Officer, having been with the company since 1999.

By 2008, Thoughtworks employed 1,000 people and was growing at the rate of 20–30% p.a., with bases around the world. Its clients included Microsoft, Oracle, major banks, and The Guardian newspaper. Singham owned 97% of the common stock of the company. By 2010, its clients included Daimler AG, Siemens and Barclays, and had opened a second headquarters in Bangalore.

In 2010, Singham opened Thoughtworks’ Fifth Agile Software Development Conference in Beijing.

2010s to present 
In 2010, Jim Highsmith joined Thoughtworks. 

In April 2013, Thoughtworks announced a collective leadership structure and appointed four co-Presidents of the global organization. The appointments followed the announcement that the then current CEO, Trevor Mather, was leaving Thoughtworks to take up the role of CEO for the used car sales business Trader Media Group.

In May 2013, Dr. David Walton was hired as Director of Global Health. Walton has done work in Haiti since 1999, including helping establish a 300-room, solar-powered hospital and the establishment of a noncommunicable disease clinic.

In 2015, Guo Xiao, who started as a developer in Thoughtworks China in 1999, became the chief executive officer and President. Also in 2015, Chinese marketing data company AdMaster acquired Chinese online form automation platform JinShuJu from Thoughtworks.

In early 2016, Thoughtworks closed their Toronto offices, the last remaining Canadian office after the closure of their Calgary offices in 2013. They have since reopened the Toronto office.

Singham sold the company to British private equity firm Apax Partners in 2017 for an undisclosed sum, by which time it had 4,500 employees across 15 countries, including South Africa and Uganda. Singham left the company. Its chief scientist, Martin Fowler, wrote that Singham had not been involved in the running of the business for some years by that time:"While I was surprised to hear that he was selling the company, the news was not unexpected. Over the last few years Roy has been increasingly involved in his activist work, and spending little time running Thoughtworks... He's been able to do this because he's built a management team that's capable of running the company largely without him. But as I saw him spend more energy on his activist work, it was apparent it would be appealing to him to accelerate that activism with the money that selling Thoughtworks would bring."

After 2017, several members of Thoughtworks senior staff began to work for the People's Support Foundation, founded by Singham's partner Jodie Evans with the support of Chad Wathington, Thoughtworks’ chief strategy officer, and Jason Pfetcher, Thoughtworks’ former general counsel.

Thoughtworks announced that it acquired Gemini Solutions Inc. in January 2021. Gemini is a privately held software development consulting services firm, and it is based in Romania. At the end of January 2021, Thoughtworks raised $720 million in funding according to data compiled by Chicago Inno. The following month, Thoughtworks acquired Fourkind, a machine learning and data science consulting company based in Finland. In March 2021, Thoughtworks worked with the Veterans Affairs Department to deploy a centralized mechanism for delivering updates via 'VANotify'.

On September 15th, 2021, Thoughtworks IPO’d on the NASDAQ and is listed as $TWKS.

In April 2022, Thoughtworks acquired Connected, a product development company based in Canada.

Corporate philosophy 
Thoughtworks launched its Social Impact Program in 2009. This program provided pro-bono or other developmental help for non-profits and organizations with socially-driven missions. Clients included Democracy Now! (mobile content delivery site), Human Network International (mobile data collection), and the Institute for Reproductive Health (SMS-based fertility planner). In 2010, Thoughtworks provided software engineering services for Grameen Foundation's Mifos platform.

Translation Cards is an open source Android app that helps field workers and refugees communicate more effectively and confidently. With the help of Google volunteers, Mercy Corps partnered with Thoughtworks and UNHCR to create the app.

Books by Thoughtworks employees 
An abbreviated list of books written by Thoughtworks employees
 1999 - Refactoring, by Martin Fowler. Addison-Wesley Professional. 
 2002 - Patterns of Enterprise Application Architecture, by Martin Fowler. Addison-Wesley Longman, Inc. 
 2010 - Continuous Delivery, by Jez Humble and David Farley. Addison-Wesley Professional. 
 2014 - Lean Enterprise: How High Performance Organizations Innovate at Scale, by Jez Humble, Joanne Molesky, Barry O'Reilly. O'Reilly. 
 2015 - Building Microservices, by Sam Newman. O'Reilly. 
 2015 - Agile IT Organization Design, by Sriram Narayan. Addison-Wesley Professional. 
 2015 - Fluent Python, by Luciano Ramalho. O'Reilly.  
 2016 - Infrastructure as Code, by Kief Morris. O'Reilly. 
 2017 - Building Evolutionary Architectures, by Neal Ford, Rebecca Parsons and Patrick Kua. O'Reilly. 
2017 - Understanding Design Thinking Lean, and Agile, by Jonny Schneider
 2018 - Enterprise Agility: Being Agile in a Changing World, by Sunil Mundra. Packt Publishing. 
2018 - EDGE: Leading your digital transformation with value-driven portfolio management, by Jim Highsmith, David Robinson, and Linda Luu.
2019 - Digital Transformation Game Plan, by Mike Mason, Guo Xiao, Gary O'Brien
2020 - Fundamentals of Software Architecture, by Mark Richards and Neal Ford
2021 - Software Architecture: The Hard Parts, by Neal Ford, Mark Richards, Pramod Sadalage and Zhamak Dehghani
2022 - Data Mesh: Delivering Data-Driven Value at Scale, by Zhamak Dehghani 
2023 - Practical Data Privacy: Enhancing Privacy and Security in Data, by Katharine Jarmul

See also
 Software industry in Telangana

References

External links 

Indian companies established in 1993
Software companies established in 1993
Companies listed on the Nasdaq
Enterprise architecture
Enterprise application integration
Information technology consulting firms of the United States
Linux companies
Software companies based in Illinois
Software companies of India
Software design
Software development process
Agile software development
Software companies of the United States
2021 initial public offerings